George Eaton may refer to:

George Eaton (born 1945), Canadian former racing driver
George Eaton (cricketer) (1904–1938), Australian cricketer
George Eaton (journalist) (born 1986), British journalist
Bill Eaton (politician) (1931–2011), Australian politician